Peter Prompe (born 26 May 1947) is a German rower who represented East Germany. He competed at the 1968 Summer Olympics in Mexico City with the men's eight where they came seventh.

References

1947 births
Living people
German male rowers
Olympic rowers of East Germany
Rowers at the 1968 Summer Olympics
Rowers from Berlin